Vellore is a legislative assembly constituency in the Indian state of Tamil Nadu. Its State Assembly Constituency number is 43. It includes the city of Vellore and forms a part of the Vellore Lok Sabha constituency for national elections to the Parliament of India. It is one of the 234 State Legislative Assembly Constituencies in Tamil Nadu in India.

Vellore was one of the 17 assembly constituencies to have VVPAT facility with EVMs in the 2016 Tamil Nadu Legislative Assembly election.
Most successful party: DMK (7 times)

Madras State

Tamil Nadu

Election results

2021

2016

2011

2006

2001

1996

1991

1989

1984

1980

1977

1971

1967

1962

1957

1952

References 

Assembly constituencies of Tamil Nadu
Vellore